was a Japanese daimyō (feudal lord) of the Sengoku period. He died in 1560 while marching to Kyoto to become Shogun. He was killed in the village of Dengakuhazama in Okehazama by Oda Nobunaga.

Early life and succession
Yoshimoto was born in 1519, the third son of Imagawa Ujichika of the Imagawa clan, which claimed descent from Emperor Seiwa (850–880). His childhood name was Yosakimaru (芳菊丸). His family branched from Minamoto clan by the Ashikaga clan. As he was not the eldest son, he was not an heir to his father's lordship.

In 1536, his older brother Ujiteru died suddenly, unleashing successional disputes. His elder half-brother, tried to seize the lordship, but the clan split into two factions. Yoshimoto's faction argued he was the rightful heir because Yoshimoto's mother (Jukei-ni) was the consort of Ujichika. Genkō Etan's faction disputed this based on Genkō's seniority, and that his mother was a member of the Kushima family. Baigaku Shōhō changed his name to Yoshimoto at this point and succeeded the clan.

Imagawa Campaigns
After Yoshimoto succeeded to family headship, he married the sister of Takeda Shingen of Kai. This allowed Yoshimoto to cement an alliance with the Takeda when he helped Shingen imprison his father, Takeda Nobutora, in 1540. Soon after, Later Hōjō clan invaded into the Suruga province but Yoshimoto defeated Later Hōjō's force. 

In 1542, Yoshimoto began his advance into Mikawa Province, in an effort to fight the growing influence of Oda Nobuhide in that region, but was defeated in the Battle of Azukizaka (1542). 

Later in 1548, Yoshimoto defeated Nobuhide in the Second Battle of Azukizaka and continued to expand his territory until 1560. In campaigns over the course of the ensuing decades, Yoshimoto wrested control over the Suruga, Totomi, and Mikawa provinces.

In 1552, Shingen's son, Takeda Yoshinobu, married Yoshimoto's daughter. Yoshimoto and the Hōjō clan reached a peace agreement in 1554 with the marriage of Yoshimoto's son, Ujizane, to the daughter of Hōjō Ujiyasu, Lady Hayakawa. 

In 1554, the Imagawa clan came to the west and built the Muraki Castle in the southeast of Owari, besieging Mizuno Nobumoto (uncle of Tokugawa Ieyasu) in his castle of Ogawa, who defected from the Imagawa in favor of an alliance with Oda Nobunaga.

In 1558, Yoshimoto send Matsudaira Motoyasu to attack Terabe Castle, but were driven off by reinforcements sent by Oda Nobunaga. Later, Yoshimoto left the clan's political affairs in Imagawa Ujizane's hands, in order to focus on dealing with the advance westward into Mikawa and Owari.

Death

Battle of Okehazama

In the summer of 1560, after forming a three-way alliance with the Takeda and the Hōjō, Yoshimoto headed out to the capital with Matsudaira Motoyasu (later known as 'Tokugawa Ieyasu') of Mikawa in the vanguard. Despite having a strong force of 25,000, Yoshimoto deliberately announced that he had 40,000 troops. While this statement put fear in many factions, Oda Nobunaga of Owari Province saw through it. (Some historical sources support the claim of 40,000.)

After capturing several castles from the Oda clan, Yoshimoto's army let its guard down, celebrating with song and sake. However, a surprise attack by the Oda Nobunaga army of 3,000 following a downpour left Yoshimoto's army in complete disorder. Two Oda samurai (Mōri Shinsuke and Hattori Koheita) ambushed the Imagawa army and killed Yoshimoto in the village of Dengakuhazama.

Imagawa Ujizane succeeded to family headship after Yoshimoto's death, but the Imagawa clan fell from power. Ujizane was later summoned by Tokugawa Ieyasu and became a kōke in the administration of the Tokugawa clan. Yoshimoto's niece was Lady Tsukiyama, the wife of Tokugawa Ieyasu.

Yoshimoto has several graves; his body itself is buried at Daisei-ji, a temple in the city of Toyokawa in modern Aichi Prefecture.

Family
 Father: Imagawa Ujichika
 Mother: Jukei-ni (d. 1568).
 Wife: Jōkei-in (1519–1550)
 Concubine: Ii Naohira's daughter
 Children: 
 Imagawa Ujizane by Jōkei-in
 Chotoku Ichigetsu (d. 1625) by Jōkei-in
 Reishō-in (d. 1612) married Takeda Yoshinobu by Jōkei-in
 Daughter (隆福院)
 daughter married Mure Katsushige

Appearances in popular fiction
See People of the Sengoku period in popular culture.

He is a playable character in Pokémon Conquest (Pokémon + Nobunaga's Ambition in Japan), with his partner Pokémon being Pineco and Forretress.

In the Samurai Warriors series, Yoshimoto is represented as a foolish old-fashioned nobleman. His weapon is a kemari which is inspired by his son, Ujizane's historical obsession towards kemari. In Samurai Warriors 5, however, where he fights with a warhammer and his ancestral katana Samonji, he is instead portrayed as an arrogant but effective leader who is a persistent threat to the young Oda Nobunaga, even defeating him in combat in one battle and forcing the Oda army to withdraw, before his eventual defeat at Okehazama.

A female version of Yoshimoto appears in anime The Ambition of Oda Nobuna. In this version, instead of dying Yoshimoto is spared and later installed as a figurehead Shōgun to legitimize Nobuna's claim to Kyoto.

In Sengoku Basara game and anime series, he was shown to be a weak leader, using his vassals as decoys while trying to retreat. In anime version, he was killed by Oda Nobunaga.

References

External links

  "Suruga Imagawa-shi" on Harimaya.com

1519 births
1560 deaths
Daimyo
Rinzai Buddhists
Japanese warriors killed in battle
Imagawa clan
Japanese Buddhist clergy